Clanculus atypicus is a species of sea snail, a marine gastropod mollusk in the family Trochidae, the top snails.

Description
(Original description by Tom Iredale) The small, solid, umbilicate shell has a depressedly globose shape with six whorls. Its periphery is rounded, and its base flattened. The colour of the shell is dark greyish-brown, painted obliquely with yellow or fawn. Its sculpture consists of fine spiral threads of varying strengths, about eighteen major ones on the body whorl. The preceding whorl shows six major threads only. The axial sculpture is represented by very fine close lines. The suture is deep, channelled, bounded by a row of nodules. The oblique aperture is subquadrate. The outer lip is slightly crenulate and recurved. The deep umbilicus is surrounded by a noduled callused rim, the callus extending to meet the outer lip. The columella is obliquely inserted in the umbilicus, with a small nodule at each end. The operculum is circular, horny, thin, multispiral, with a central nucleus.

Distribution
This marine species is endemic to New Zealand, occurring off the Kermadec Islands.

References

 Iredale T. (1912). New generic names and new species of marine mollusca. Proceedings of the Zoological Society of London (1912) 1: 217-228

External links
 To Biodiversity Heritage Library (5 publications)
 To World Register of Marine Species

atypicus
Gastropods of New Zealand
Gastropods described in 1912